The 2022 Port Adelaide Football Club season was the club's 26th season in the Australian Football League (AFL) and the 152nd year since its inception in 1870. The club also fielded its reserves men's team in the South Australian National Football League (SANFL) and its inaugural women's team in the AFL Women's (AFLW).

Squads

AFL

SANFL

AFLW

AFL season

Pre-season

Regular season

Ladder

SANFL season

Pre-season

Regular season

Ladder

AFLW season

Pre-season

Regular season

Ladder

Awards

Power (AFL)
  – Connor Rozee
  – Travis Boak
  – Dan Houston
  – Travis Boak
  – Lachie Jones
  – Connor Rozee
  – Sam Mayes
Source:

Magpies (SANFL)
  – Cam Sutcliffe
  – Sam Mayes
  – Nick Moore
  – Dylan Williams (20 goals)
  – Alf Trebilcock
Source:

Power (AFLW)
  – Hannah Ewings
  – Erin Phillips
  – Abbey Dowrick
  – Hannah Ewings
  – Ella Boag
  – Ebony O'Dea
Source:

Notes

References

External links
 Official website of the Port Adelaide Football Club
 Official website of the Australian Football League

2022
Port Adelaide Football Club